"Coca-Cola Cowboy" is a song written by Steve Dorff, Sandy Pinkard, Sam Atchley and Bud Dain, and recorded by American country music artist Mel Tillis.   It was released in June 1979 as the first single from the album Mr. Entertainer.  The song was featured in the film, Every Which Way but Loose, starring Clint Eastwood and the TV movie Bandit Goes Country (which also had Tillis in the film) starring Brian Bloom.  It was Tillis' fifth number one on the U.S. country singles chart, where it spent one week at the top and a total of eleven weeks on the chart.

When Tillis performs the song in Every Which Way but Loose, one line of the lyrics is changed. The line "You've got an Eastwood smile and Robert Redford hair," is changed to "You've got a sexist smile and Robert Redford hair," probably to avoid referencing the film's star Clint Eastwood, who was in the audience as part of the film.

Charts

Weekly charts

Year-end charts

References

1979 singles
1979 songs
Mel Tillis songs
Songs about cowboys and cowgirls
Songs written for films
Songs written by Steve Dorff
Song recordings produced by Jimmy Bowen
MCA Records singles